William Thomas Schultz (6 July 1938 – 18 April 2015) was a New Zealand rugby league footballer who played for Eastern Suburbs and the New Zealand national team.

Playing career
Schultz played for the Point Chevalier Pirates and Marist Saints in the Auckland Rugby League competition. An Auckland representative, he played for Auckland against France in 1964 and Great Britain in 1966.
 
He toured Australia with the New Zealand national rugby league team in 1959 and toured France and England in 1965, scoring one test try.

In 1968, Schultz moved to Australia to play for the Eastern Suburbs Roosters in the New South Wales Rugby League competition for two seasons.

He finished his rugby league career coaching the Point Chevalier Pirates. He was the older brother of fellow New Zealand rugby league international Paul Schultz.

References

1938 births
2015 deaths
New Zealand rugby league players
New Zealand national rugby league team players
Sydney Roosters players
Rugby league hookers
Point Chevalier Pirates coaches
Point Chevalier Pirates players
New Zealand rugby league coaches
Marist Saints players
Auckland rugby league team players